Admiral Luis de Córdova y Córdova (8 February 1706 – 29 July 1796) was a Spanish admiral. He is best known for his command of the Spanish fleet during the Anglo-Spanish War. His best remembered actions were the capture of two merchant convoys totalling 79 ships between 1780 and 1782, including the capture of 55 ships from a convoy composed of Indiamen, and other cargo ships 60 leagues off Cape St. Vincent. In 1782 he battled the Royal Navy to a stalemate at the Battle of Cape Spartel, but failed to prevent the British relieving the Great Siege of Gibraltar.

Early life

Córdova was born in Seville to don Juan de Córdova Lasso de la Vega y Puente, a mariner, navy captain, and knight of the Order of Calatrava, and doña Clemencia Fernández de Córdova Lasso de la Vega Veintimiglia, daughter of the Marquis of Vado del Maestre and first-cousin of her husband. He was baptised at San Miguel parish on 12 February.

His inclination toward the sea began at a young age — at 11 he enlisted aboard his father's ship and by 13 he had made his first journey to America. In 1721 he joined the naval academy at Cádiz and by 1723 graduated with the rank of Alférez de Fragata (ensign). The first lap of his career was marked by successful cruises and actions at sea that won the approval of his superiors and even the praise of the King.

In 1730 Córdova had the distinction of commanding the naval escort for the Duke of Parma, Infante Carlos de Borbón (later Charles III of Spain), who journeyed across the Mediterranean en route to the campaigns in Italy. Carlos and his generals went on to reconquer the Kingdom of Naples for the Bourbons at the Battle of Bitonto, with naval assistance from a squadron commanded by Córdova.

In 1732 he was promoted to lieutenant on a frigate, the year in which he participated in the capture of Oran. Two years later he would do it in the reconquest of Naples and Sicily.

The Order of Calatrava 
In 1735 he was promoted to lieutenant and in August 1740 to captain of a frigate. This same year he took part in the fights against the Algerian pirates in the Mediterranean. He was appointed captain of the ship in 1747, and in command of the ship América, in union with the Dragon (both with 60 guns), under the command of Pedro Fitz-James Stuart (later the Marquis of San Leonardo), they engaged in combat near Cape Saint Vincent against the Algerian ships Danzik (60 guns) and Castillo Nuevo (54), the first captain of Algiers. The New Castle withdrew at the first volleys, but the Danzik continued fighting for about 30 hours in the space of four days, until it lost half its crew.2 After a sieve, it lowered its flag and had to be burned as it could not be used. . Fifty Christian captives were rescued. For this action, King Ferdinand VI granted Córdoba a commission from the Order of Calatrava.3

The city of Cordova, Alaska was named after him.

America and England 
Later he took part in the escort of various convoys of the Carrera de Indias, and in the period 1754-1758 he had some outstanding performances in which he fought smuggling in Cartagena de Indias. In the absence of the rank of brigadier at that time, which was created in 1773, he was directly promoted to squad leader on July 13, 1760.

He then took command of a squadron with which he made multiple navigations, especially through North American waters, and with which he participated in various commissions, such as the gala parade held in 1765 in the waters of Cartagena to celebrate various events. He ended the command of said squad upon his return to Cádiz in March 1774, and in December of that same year he was promoted to lieutenant general, at 68 years of age.

Spain allied with France by family pacts, in the middle of the American war of independence Luis de Córdova was appointed commander of a Spanish squad, which joined the French squad of Orvilliers when in June 1779 war was declared on England. The combined Franco-Spanish fleet, in which there were 68 ships - of which the Spanish Santísima Trinidad carried the Cordova insignia - entered the English Channel to attempt the invasion of the British Isles in August 1779. The English ships took refuge in their ports, causing the collapse of British trade, and the English 74-gun ship Ardent was seized, which was left behind.

King Carlos III.

For this meritorious campaign, Córdova received as a gift from King Louis XVI of France a gold box richly adorned with diamonds with the expressive dedication "Luis a Luis". On his side, the King of Spain awarded him the Grand Cross of Carlos III, at that time the most valuable distinction.

Castle of Brest.

The fruits of this campaign were, however, scarce, since differences of opinion arose between the French and Spanish command. The former wanted at all costs to destroy the enemy squadron first, and then carry out the planned landing in Great Britain. The Spanish advocated to carry out the disembarkation immediately, on the grounds that the enemy squad was not in a position to avoid it. In the end there was no landing, and the facts proved the Spaniards right. With isolated actions, the English hindered the actions of the combined fleet and managed to prepare to face the situation, which together with bad weather, scurvy and a typhus epidemic that affected the crews, made the allied squad desist, who retired to Brest.

The French general, Count of Guichen, was amazed that Córdova took certain precautions against bad weather when the weather was still good and, on the contrary, that he ordered them to be suspended while it was still in the end of a storm and to them it seemed full. strength of him. The French admiral asked Mazarredo where such a forecast came from and the major general showed him the marine barometers that the Spanish ships had begun to use when the French allies did not yet have them.

General Director of the Spanish Navy 

At that time, Luis de Córdova was already 73 years old, and many French people believed that, although in the past he had been a good officer, he was already very old and his head was failing. But Floridablanca, in a letter to Aranda dated November 27, 1779, said that it seemed to him that "the old man is more encouraged and suffered than the young men of Brest", and added that none of his detractors had been able to advance, improve or rectify none of your action plans. Due to this, on February 7, 1780 he was appointed general director of the Navy.

Cordova commanding the same combined squadron and over Cape Santa María, on August 9, 1780, with 27 ships under his command, captured a rich British convoy of 57 frigates loaded for the English army in North America and India, escorted by three War frigates that went to the Royal Navy of Spain with the names of Colón, Santa Balbina and Santa Paula. This logistical blow has remained the greatest ever suffered by the Royal Navy: he captured one of the largest and richest convoys ever to leave Portsmouth. Córdoba took 3,000 prisoners from the endowments that day, plus 1,800 soldiers from the royal companies of the East and West Indies, valuing the captured loot, merchandise and ammunition, at 1 million dollars. Despite the persecution that he was subjected to by the enemy naval forces, which constituted the most distant protection of the convoy, he managed to lead his prey to Cádiz, which had great echo in the press of the time and made him a hero of the moment.

In the 1781 campaign, also in the English Channel, the squad suffered violent storms without experiencing setbacks and serious ills, thanks to the correct dispositions taken by General Córdova seconded by his Major General José de Mazarredo. In this campaign he also had the success of seizing another British convoy of 24 ships and taking it to Brest.

In these navigations and battles, the good instruction of the Spanish crews stood out, as a result of the efforts of the major general, effectively seconded by Escaño, at the time the assistant of the majority. Before they were published, the effects of what was to later become the Ordinances of the Navy, the product of the laborious work and experience of these two eminent sailors, were beginning to be felt.

The blockade of Gibraltar 

Back in Spain, in 1782 he commanded the combined naval forces that had gathered in the bay of Algeciras to blockade Gibraltar and attempt to take it. He participated with direct attacks on the square, on the occasion when Antonio Barceló commanded the employees directly in the attack at close range, and then the floating batteries attacked, under the orders of General Ventura Moreno Zavala, supported with the fires of his ships from this unfortunate attack of the invention of the French d'Arçon. When these were set ablaze by the red bullets of the defenders, he sent his smaller boats to put out the fires and save the crews. In the fires and blasts of these heavy batteries, theoretically unsinkable and incombustible, with water circulating "like blood through the human body", there were 338 dead, 638 wounded, 80 drowned and 335 prisoners. But the effects were far outweighed by the bombardment of the gunboats invented by Barceló, which made it effective.

He continued the blockade of Gibraltar, which was defended by Governor Elliot. The ships remained at sea and only took refuge in Algeciras during hard times. The situation in the square became very tight, so the English decided to send a large convoy, escorted by a force of 30 ships under the command of Admiral Richard Howe. The Englishman entered the Mediterranean running a storm from the southwest and Córdova came out to meet him, but Howe took advantage of the storm and managed to bring the convoy ships with the much-awaited resources into the square, without Córdova being able to prevent it. In the storm, a Spanish ship, the San Miguel, was lost, thrown by the storm under the very walls of Gibraltar, and other Spanish ships suffered many damage.

When Lord Howe was returning to the Atlantic, Córdoba again met him and on October 20, 1782, the battle of Cape Spartel was locked. The British admired "the Spanish way of maneuvering, their ready line of battle, the swift positioning of the flagship in the center of the force and the opportunity with which the rear guard forced the sail, shortening the distances."

After five hours of indecisive combat, the 34 British ships, longer than the 46 Spanish-French, refused to continue. The Spanish colossus, the ship Santísima Trinidad, was only able to completely discharge all of its batteries.

Peace was signed with Great Britain on January 30, 1783, by which the island of Menorca and Florida were restored to Spain. The king rewarded the services of Córdoba by appointing him general director of the Navy on February 7, 1783 and shortly afterwards captain general. Córdova lowered his insignia of the combined squad the following May 1.

On July 2, 1786, he laid the first stone of the Pantheon of Illustrious Sailors of the Island of León (today San Fernando), the town where he died on July 29, 1796, at the age of 90, being buried in the church of San Francisco of said locality. In 1851 the transfer of his remains to the Pantheon of Illustrious Sailors was decreed, which was fulfilled in 1870.

Offspring 
Luis de Córdova y Córdova, married to María Andrea de Romay, had a son, Antonio de Córdova y Romay, who also entered the Navy and died in 1782 after having reached the rank of brigadier.

Other honors

Eponymy 

 Cordova (Alaska): named in 1790, by the Spanish explorer Salvador Fidalgo.

See 

 Capture of the English double convoy (1780)

References 

 
 "The capture of the ship Danzik.". Retrieved July 10, 2008.

Bibliography 

 González de Canales, Fernando. Catalog of Paintings of the Naval Museum. Volume II. Ministry of Defence. Madrid, 2000. pp. 178–179.
 Martínez-Valverde and Martínez, Carlos. General Encyclopedia of the Sea. Garriga, 1957.
 Peña Blanco, Joaquín Guillermo. The Royal Navy against the Royal Navy. The Spanish Navy on the European front for the independence of the United States. (2020) Alicante: Editorial EAS

External links 
Wikimedia Commons hosts a multimedia category on Luis de Córdova and Córdova.

González Fernández, Marcelino (2018). "Luis de Córdova and Córdova". Spanish Biographical Dictionary. Royal Academy of History.

Text adapted with permission of the author, which allowed its reproduction in Wikipedia under license GFDL: Naval History Forum of Spain and Spanish-speaking countries (registration required).

Notes

Captain generals of the Navy
Spanish admirals
Spanish military personnel of the American Revolutionary War
1706 births
1796 deaths